Flagler Street is a  main east–west road in Miami.  Flagler Street is the latitudinal baseline that divides all the streets on the Miami-Dade County grid plan as north or south streets (the east-west division is along Miami Avenue). Flagler Street is named after industrialist Henry Flagler and serves as a major commercial east–west highway through central Miami-Dade County, with a mixture of residential neighborhoods (featuring apartment complexes) and strip malls, the commercial presence increasing as SR 968 approaches downtown Miami.

Between SR 973 (Galloway Road/West 87th Avenue) and West 2nd Avenue, Flagler Street is signed State Road 968 (SR 968).

Route description
State Road 968 begins at Galloway Road in Fontainebleau, as it takes the six lane Flagler Street east through a mostly commercial area with residential housing dotting the street as it quickly approaches the Mall of the Americas (formerly Midway Mall) to the north and the interchange with the Palmetto Expressway at the eastern end of the mall.  Seven blocks east of the interchange, the road enters the city of Miami proper after crossing the Tamiami Canal one block west of the intersection with Milam Dairy Road and becomes a four lane road from here until reaching I-95.  At NW 67th Court, the divided highway comes together as a four lane road continuing east, with business lining both sides of the street.  Following Red Road (West 57th Avenue), it reaches Flagler Memorial Park to the north, as the road continues east through more businesses and apartment complexes.  The road then intersects with LeJeune Road (West 42nd Avenue), which provides access to Miami International Airport, with SR 968 continuing east towards central Miami.

At the northwest corner of the intersection with West 27th Avenue (SR 9) sits the Miami-Dade Auditorium concert hall, as Flagler Street continues east for three more blocks, until at NW 24th Avenue, the road becomes a one way pair, with Flagler Street going westbound, and SW 1st Street going eastbound and both roads featuring commercial businesses and parks.  The road then intersects West 17th Avenue just a few blocks south of Marlins Park, as SR 968 enters Central Miami.  From 12th Avenue West to the Miami River, Flagler Street features one eastbound lane with three westbound lanes, with the intersection with US 441/SR 7 (West 7th Street) just four blocks west of the Miami River drawbridges.  Immediately after, it reaches I-95, with access via nearby streets.  The rest of the road features government and business skyscrapers and metro rapid transit trackage towering over the road.  At SW 2nd Avenue, SR 968 meets its eastern terminus, and Flagler Street (former SR 968) is once again a two-way street, with one lane in each direction.  At Miami Avenue, Flagler Street forms the center of Miami, as Miami Avenue represents the baseline for east and west.  The road becomes East Flagler Street as it continues through central Miami, terminating at Biscayne Boulevard (U.S. Route 1), with Bayfront Park, featuring a scenic view of Biscayne Bay just east of the end of Flagler Street.

Beyond SR 968's western terminus, West Flagler Street extends west to State Road 985 to end at an intersection with West 118th Avenue in Tamiami, just west of the Homestead Extension.

History

Formerly State Road 954, Flagler Street received its current Florida Department of Transportation designation in 1983, when FDOT reassigned route numbers to various streets in southeastern Florida and removed the SR 968 designation from North Miami Boulevard (now State Road 922).

SR 968's original western terminus was at an intersection with SR 985 (Avenue of the Americas/West 107th Avenue).  In 1987, FDOT truncated the westernmost two miles of the route to its current configuration. SR 968's original eastern terminus was at Biscayne Boulevard (US 1) in Miami, until FDOT turned over the section between US 1 and SW 2nd Avenue to the city of Miami.

As a condition for the relinquishment of Brickell Avenue (US 1) to the city of Miami, FDOT plans to adopt both SE 1st Street and NE 1st Street in downtown Miami as part of SR 968 and re-connect the route to Biscayne Boulevard.

Major intersections

See also

Downtown Miami
Brickell
Brickell Avenue
Miami Avenue
Biscayne Boulevard
Transportation in South Florida

Gallery

References

External links

Roads in Miami
Roads in Miami-Dade County, Florida
Shopping districts and streets in the United States